Das kleine Haus is an Austrian television series.

See also
List of Austrian television series

Austrian television series
Austrian children's television series
1968 Austrian television series debuts
1975 Austrian television series endings
1960s Austrian television series
1970s Austrian television series
ORF (broadcaster)
German-language television shows